Schnaittach (in its upper course before the confluence with the Ittlinger Bach: Naifer Bach) is a river of Bavaria, Germany. It is a right tributary of the Pegnitz near Neunkirchen am Sand. It passes through the town Schnaittach.

See also
List of rivers of Bavaria

References

Rivers of Bavaria
Nürnberger Land
Rivers of Germany